Kamwookya, sometimes spelled as Kamwokya, is a location within the city of Kampala, Uganda's capital and largest metropolitan area.

Location
Kamwookya is bordered by Kyebando to the north, Bukoto to the northeast, Naguru to the east, Kololo to the southeast, Nakasero to the south and Mulago to the west. The coordinates of Kamwookya are:0°20'33.0"N, 32°35'20.0"E (Latitude:0.342500; Longitude:32.588889).

Overview
Kamwookya is a mixed residential and commercial area of the city, with a large number of small Information Technology (IT) businesses. Kamwookya is also the location of a central market, restaurants, shops, dry-cleaners and sports bars, many of them, upscale. Closer to the city center, one can find several foreign embassies, government buildings and an upscale shopping mall. (See Points of interest below:).

In the northern portion of Kamwookya, between the Kampala Northern Bypass Highway and Kira Road, the neighborhood is a densely packed slum, with poorly constructed housing units, poor drainage and rudimentary sanitary infrastructure, with attendant public health challenges.

Notable people 
Robert Kyagulanyi Ssentamu, known as Bobi Wine, Ugandan musician, activist, actor and politician.

Points of interest
The points of interest in or near Kamwookya include:
 NBS Television Ltd
 Iwat Solutions. One of the few recognized Ugandan based live stream service providers 
 British High Commission 
 High Commission of the Republic of Rwanda
 Uganda National Museum
 Uganda Wildlife Authority Headquarters 
 Acacia Mall - technically Kamwokya lies on Kololo Hill. Acacia Mall, an upscale, six-storey, air-conditioned shopping center at the corner of Kira Road and Acacia Avenue, where Kamwokya meets Kololo proper.
 Katego Family Planning Clinic - a private medical facility 
 S&J Strategies Limited - a communications consulting firm
 Kampala Northern Bypass Highway - the highway passes through the northern reaches of Kamwookya.
 Saint Francis Students Community Center - a public community center for area and visiting students
 Makerere Guest House - a private lodging facility. (Not to be confused with Makerere University Guest House, which is located on the main campus of Makerere University).
 Kampala City View Guest House - a private lodging facility, at the corner of Kira Road and Tufnell Drive.
 A branch of Guaranty Trust Bank (Uganda) - one of the commercial banks in the country
 A branch of Imperial Bank Uganda - in the Acacia Mall
 A branch of Orient Bank - in the Acacia Mall
 Daks Couriers Limited – the leading privately owned courier, transport and logistics company in the country.

See also

References

External links
  Kamwokya Market Vendors Tipped On Savings
 Kamwokya Art Gallery Serves Katogo

Neighborhoods of Kampala
Kampala Central Division